The women's 1500 metres event at the 1999 Pan American Games was held on July 28.

Results

References

Athletics at the 1999 Pan American Games
1999
1999 in women's athletics